Grant Rosenberg is an American novelist, screenwriter and producer. He has worked on such television series as Bitten, Lost Girl, XIII-The Series, Fear Itself, Eureka, Masters of Science Fiction, Masters Of Horror, The Outer Limits, and Lois & Clark: The New Adventures of Superman. Prior to moving into writing and producing, he was an executive with both Paramount Television and Walt Disney Studios.

Writing and production credits
MacGyver (1989-1991)
Star Trek: The Next Generation (1992)
Lois & Clark: The New Adventures of Superman (1996–1997)
Poltergeist: The Legacy (1996–1999)
The Outer Limits (1999–2000)
Tracker (2001)
Jeremiah (2002)
Masters of Horror (2005)
Masters of Science Fiction (2006)
Eureka (2007)
Fear Itself (2008)
XIII (2010)
Lost Girl (2011-2012)
Bitten (2013-2014)
Olympus (2014-2015)

References

External links

Year of birth missing (living people)
Living people
American male screenwriters
American television producers
University of California, Davis alumni